Dwayne Evans (born January 24, 1992) is an American basketball player for Hiroshima Dragonflies of the Japanese B.League. He was an All-Atlantic 10 Conference college basketball player at Saint Louis University (SLU).

College career

Evans came to SLU to play for coach Rick Majerus from Neuqua Valley High School in the Chicago suburb of Naperville, Illinois and was an immediate impact player for the Billikens, averaging 8.5 points and 6.5 rebounds per game as a freshman and making the Atlantic 10 Conference All-Rookie team. As a sophomore, Evans made the leap to being a top player in the conference. He then became a first-team All-Atlantic 10 player in both his junior and senior seasons. In addition to conference honors, Evans was named a finalist for the Senior CLASS Award. As a senior, he averaged 14.0 points and 6.5 rebounds per game.

Professional career
Following the close of his college career, Evans was chosen to play in the Reese's college All-Star Game. After going undrafted in the 2014 NBA draft, Evans took a year off from basketball, ultimately signing with Gladiators Trier of the German ProA for the 2015–16 season. After averaging 15.7 points and 8.6 rebounds, he moved up a division to the Basketball Bundesliga with the Gießen 46ers. After averaging 11.8 points and 7.1 rebounds, he signed with MHP Riesen Ludwigsburg for the 2017–18 season.

For the 2018–19 season, Evans signed with ratiopharm Ulm of the Bundesliga and EuroCup. He averaged 12.6 points, 6.2 rebounds and 1.9 assists for ratiopharm Ulm. Evans signed with Dinamo Sassari in Italy on July 23, 2019. He averaged 14.1 points and 7.1 rebounds per game. Evans left the team on June 14, 2020.

On August 25, 2020, Evans signed with Ryukyu Golden Kings of the Japanese B.League.

On June 9, 2022, Evans signed with Hiroshima Dragonflies of the Japanese B.League.

References

External links

Saint Louis Billikens bio
College stats @ sports-reference.com

1992 births
Living people
American expatriate basketball people in Germany
American expatriate basketball people in Italy
American men's basketball players
Basketball players from Illinois
Dinamo Sassari players
Giessen 46ers players
Lega Basket Serie A players
Riesen Ludwigsburg players
People from Bolingbrook, Illinois
Power forwards (basketball)
Ratiopharm Ulm players
Saint Louis Billikens men's basketball players
Small forwards
Sportspeople from DuPage County, Illinois